Ibogo may refer to:

Ibogo, Boulgou, Burkina Faso
Ibogo, Ganzourgou, Burkina Faso